William Reader (May 16, 1864 – 1935) was a member of the Wisconsin State Assembly.

Biography
Reader was born on May 16, 1864 in Stockbridge, Wisconsin. He moved with his parents to Langlade County, Wisconsin in 1882. Pursuits he followed there include farming and the retail clothing business.

In 1891, Reader married Mary McCabe (1872–1944). They had four children. Reader and others of his family were Roman Catholics. His fraternal affiliations included the Catholic Order of Foresters.

Reader was assaulted in 1916; his attacker chewed Reader's thumb badly and gangrene set in, requiring amputation of the thumb.

Political career
Reader was a member of the Assembly during the 1909 and 1911 sessions. Additionally, he was Chairman (similar to Mayor) of Peck, Wisconsin and Register of Deeds of Langlade County. He was a Republican.

References

People from Stockbridge, Wisconsin
People from Langlade County, Wisconsin
Republican Party members of the Wisconsin State Assembly
Mayors of places in Wisconsin
20th-century Roman Catholics
Businesspeople from Wisconsin
Farmers from Wisconsin
1864 births
1935 deaths
Catholics from Wisconsin